The Battle of Skerki Bank was an engagement during the Second World War which took place near Skerki Bank in the Mediterranean Sea in the early hours of 2 December 1942. Force Q a flotilla of Royal Navy cruisers and destroyers attacked Convoy H, an Italian convoy and its  escort of destroyers and torpedo boats.

Force Q sank the four Italian merchant ships and one of the escorting destroyers in exchange for minor splinter damage. Force Q was attacked by  torpedo bombers at 06:30 on 3 December, sinking the destroyer Quentin with one torpedo and damaging the destroyer Quiberon. The battle was the first and most significant success for Force Q.

Background

Force Q

Soon after the beginning of Operation Torch, the Allied commanders began to make arrangements to intensify the offensive against the Axis supply route from Italy to Tunis and Bizerta in Tunisia. On 30 November, once Allied fighter cover could give sufficient protection, Force Q was based at Bône, a port on the north-east Algerian coast, not far from the Tunisian border.

Convoy H
Convoy H comprised the German transport KT-1 (850 gross register tons [GRT]), Aventino (3,794 GRT), Puccini (2,422 GRT) and the converted ferry Aspromonte (976 GRT). The ships were carrying reinforcements to Africa, which included 1,766 troops,  of cargo (mainly ammunition), four tanks, 32 other vehicles and twelve artillery pieces.

Prelude

On 1 December, Force Q sailed to attack Axis shipping on the convoy route from Trapani in Sicily to Tunis. Four convoys were at sea, comprising thirteen merchantmen escorted by seven destroyers and twelve torpedo boats. Three convoys were ordered to return after being spotted by British reconnaissance aircraft but Convoy H continued towards Tunis. Cocchia sent Procione ahead to sweep for mines.  had emphasised the importance of the convoy keeping in close formation but realising that hostile ships were in the area, Cocchia ordered the convoy to make a 90° turn south south-east at 00:01. At 00:17 Cocchia ordered a turn to west south-west; the convoy should have doglegged  to the south, which was close as was prudent to unmarked minefields. The convoy lost formation because Puccini missed the turn order and rammed Aspromonte; KT 1, which had no wireless, failed to follow Puccini and strayed to the north-west.

Battle 

De Recco was on a west south-west course, ahead of Aventino, Clio and Aspromonte. Force Q approached with Aurora leading, followed by Sirius, Argonaut, Quiberon and Quentin; at 00:38,  distant, the leading ships fired on KT 1 which exploded. Argonaut and Quiberon opened fire on Procione (or De Recco) as Cocchia ordered the escorts to attack. Force Q went around the hulk of KT 1 and Argonaut fired and launched a torpedo at KT 1, then at 00:39 Argonaut sailed to the north-east to what turned out to be a false contact. After a couple of minutes, Argonaut fired at Camicia Nera as it advanced to the attack, Aurora also firing at the destroyer, under the impression that it was a merchant ship. Camicia Nera turned and launched six torpedoes in two minutes from 00:43 at  range then turned north, amidst shell splashes. Argonaut was also preparing to fire on Aventino as Sirius fired on Folgore and Clio.

Sirius caught a freighter in one of its searchlights and at 00:50 Folgore turned tightly to port and fired its last three torpedoes at the searchlight; the torpedoes missed but two hits were claimed by mistake. Folgore made to the south-west at  but at 00:52 it was hit by nine shells from Argonaut causing severe flooding and a large fire. Folgore listed by 20° and capsized at 01:16. The shells killed the forward gun crew and the captain took evasive action then headed towards the south-west. Clio began to make smoke, firing at searchlights and gun flashes and De Recco tried to make a torpedo attack.

At 00:55 Quiberon broke formation to attack Clio, was bracketed by return fire. Sirius and Argonaut were firing on Puccini and at 00:58, Argonaut fired a torpedo at Puccini then one to port soon after at Aventino which was on fire. At 01:12 Sirius also launched a torpedo at Aventino which exploded and sank. De Recco had got within  of Force Q by 01:30 and launched torpedoes which missed; shell hits from Sirius, Quiberon and Quentin killed 118 members of the crew and left De Recco stopped in the water, eventually to be towed to port by Pigafetta. The British ships completed their circuit around the Italian ships and set course for Bône. Force Q was attacked by  torpedo bombers at 06:30 on 3 December, sinking Quentin with one torpedo and damaging Quiberon.

Aftermath

Analysis

In 1966 the British official historians wrote that Force Q has a "spectacular success"; in an hour, Force Q had sunk  of shipping during a "one-sided engagement" for no damage. Just after dawn, as Force Q was on the return journey to Bône, Quentin was sunk by a torpedo bomber. In 2009, Vincent O'Hara wrote that the battle was a serious Italian defeat, in which a large escort force had failed to prevent the four supply ships from being sunk. The minor damage inflicted by the Italian ships on their opponents stood in stark contrast, despite the convoy escorts managing launch so many torpedoes at such close range. The convoy had been attacked while disorganised and could not achieve a co-ordinated reply.

Casualties

Of the four freighters of Convoy H, three were sunk and one scuttled; the escort Folgore was also sunk. Two hundred members of the merchant and  crews and 1,527 troops, embarked on Aventino and Puccini were killed. The crew of Folgore suffered 126 casualties, Nicoloso da Recco 118, Aspromonte 39, Procione three. The British ships had minor splinter damage but lost Quentin to a torpedo bomber on the return journey to Bône, with the loss of 20 men.

Subsequent operations

Near the Kerkenah Banks, Fairey Albacores of the Fleet Air Arm torpedoed Veloce, which was carrying benzene and caught fire, burning brightly. Force K sailed towards the illumination as Lupo prepared to take on survivors and the rest of the convoy hugged the coast. Jervis lit up Lupo with a searchlight and opened fire at  surprising the Italian torpedo boat and destroying the bridge. The rest of the flotilla joined in and Lupo was unable to reply, all but twelve of the crew being killed. The rest of the convoy stole away into the shallow water of the Kerkenah Banks.

Convoy "B", a simultaneous Axis shipping move, composed of the Italian freighters Arlesiana, Achille Lauro and Campania and the German Menes and Lisboa, was sailing that night from Naples to Tunis. The convoy was recalled to Trapani when the presence of Force Q in the area was discovered by German aerial surveillance at 23:30. While sailing back, Convoy "B" witnessed the destruction of Convoy "H". Numerous flares were sighted to the south, in the direction of the Axis force. At 01:00, the commander of Maestrale, the leading escort, ordered the convoy to change course to Palermo, a route further to the north, to avoid detection by Force Q.

Notes

Footnotes

References

External links 
 Convoy Battle near Skerki Bank

1942 in Italy
Allied naval victories in the battle of the Mediterranean
December 1942 events
Mediterranean convoys of World War II
Skerki Bank